Dimitrios Kotsonis (born 25 January 1989) is a Greek professional footballer who plays as a centre back for Super League 2 club Anagennisi Karditsa.

References

External links

Myplayer.gr Profile
Onsports.gr Profile

1989 births
Living people
Greek expatriate footballers
Paniliakos F.C. players
Aris Thessaloniki F.C. players
Ergotelis F.C. players
Apollon Smyrnis F.C. players
PAS Lamia 1964 players
Trikala F.C. players
Panachaiki F.C. players
Luftëtari Gjirokastër players
Kategoria Superiore players
Association football central defenders
Footballers from Athens
Greek footballers
Greek expatriate sportspeople in Albania
Expatriate footballers in Albania